Eugène Deloncle (20 June 1890 – 17 January 1944) was a French politician and Fascist leader, who founded the “Secret Committee of Revolutionary Action" (CSAR), known as "The Hood" (la Cagoule), and became a prominent Nazi collaborator during World War II.

Early life
Antoine Octave Eugène was born on 20 June 1890 in Brest, Brittany, France; his parents were Antoine Charles Louis Deloncle and Anna Ange Marie  Grossetti.

His father died in tragic circumstances in 1898 when his son was 8. He was the captain of the French transatlantic liner SS La Bourgogne accidentally rammed in thick fog by sailing ship Cromartyshire off Sable Island with a high death toll. Captain Deloncle did his best to organize rescue in difficult circumstances and refusing to leave the bridge went down with his ship. Eugène Deloncle was a graduate of the École Polytechnique, and worked as a naval engineer for the French Navy. He married Mercedes Cahier on 4 February 1918 in Paris.

World War I
Deloncle served as an artillery officer during World War I, including the Champagne frontline, where he was wounded.

1930s political activity
Initially supportive of the integralist Action française, he left the movement in 1935 because of the perception of inaction of older organisations in combating the French left. Deloncle founded his own group, the Comité Secret d'Action Révolutionnaire (CSAR), with similar political goals. The new group was also known by the pseudonym of [[La Cagoule] ("The Hood"]), a term that was first applied by Charles Maurras and Maurice Pujo of Action Française, as the group's tactics reminded them of the American Ku Klux Klan, and the name was subsequently was embraced by the press. "The Hood" was a fascist and anti-communist terrorist group that kept the Orleanist and strongly anti-republican line of the Action française but added the rhetoric of fascism. "The Hood" was formed to overthrow the leftist Popular Front government of Léon Blum and in the 1930s was responsible for assassinations, including the assassination of the Rosselli brothers assignation (antifascist refugees from Italy), and terrorist attacks, including the bombing of several Paris synagogues.

World War II
In 1940, with the Fall of France during World War II and the German period of occupation, Deloncle created a movement backing Vichy France and Philippe Pétain, the Mouvement Social Révolutionnaire (MSR, Social Revolutionary Movement). MSR, a more radical form of the Cagoule, strongly supported Pétain's traditionalism, and the political experiment that was being engineered in Southern France. Afterwards, he approached the National Popular Rally (RNP) of Marcel Déat, but conflicts with the latter got him expelled in May 1942, when he was succeeded as leader by Jean Fontenoy.

Death
Deloncle's involvement with the '[Abwehr]] made him an enemy of the Gestapo. After plotting with the Abwehr against Hitler, he was shot by the Gestapo on 17 January 1944, in an assassination in which his son (Louis) was seriously wounded.

Awards

References

Sources
 
 

1890 births
1944 deaths
Politicians from Brest, France
National Popular Rally politicians
French collaborators with Nazi Germany
French fascists
Chevaliers of the Légion d'honneur
People affiliated with Action Française
Assassinated French politicians
École Polytechnique alumni
French military personnel of World War I
French anti-communists